Edemskoye is a rural locality (a selo) in Bryzgalovskoye Rural Settlement, Kameshkovsky District, Vladimir Oblast, Russia. The population was 233 as of 2010.

Geography 
Edemskoye is located 5 km northeast of Kameshkovo (the district's administrative centre) by road. Druzhba is the nearest rural locality.

References 

Rural localities in Kameshkovsky District